Snodes is an unincorporated community in Mahoning County, in the U.S. state of Ohio.

History
A post office called Snodes was established in 1886, and remained in operation until 1915. Besides the post office, Snodes had a station on the Pennsylvania Railroad.

References

Unincorporated communities in Mahoning County, Ohio
1886 establishments in Ohio
Populated places established in 1886
Unincorporated communities in Ohio